The Ghana Baptist Convention is a Baptist Christian denomination in Ghana. It is affiliated with the Baptist World Alliance. The headquarters is in Accra.

History
The Ghana Baptist Convention has its origins in a Baptist mission of Nigerian Baptist Convention in 1927 in Kumasi. It is officially founded in 1963 as the Ghana Baptist Conference. In 1964, it became autonomous from the Nigerian Baptist Convention and take the name of Ghana Baptist Convention 

According to a denomination census released in 2020, it claimed 1,850 churches and 312,020 members.

Schools
In 2006, it establishes the Ghana Baptist University College in Kumasi.

Health Services 
It founded the Baptist Medical Center in Nalerigu in 1958.
In 2018, it opened a hospital in the Jomoro District, in Western Region (Ghana).

See also 
 Bible
 Born again
 Baptist beliefs
 Worship service (evangelicalism)
 Jesus Christ
 Believers' Church

References

External links
 Official Website

Baptist denominations in Africa
Baptist Christianity in Ghana